The 1983 Virginia Slims of Washington was a women's tennis tournament that was part of the 1983 Virginia Slims World Championship Series. It was the 12th edition of the tournament, played on indoor carpet courts, and was held from January 3 through January 10, 1983. The rounds until the final were played at the GWU Charles Smith Center in Washington, D.C., U.S. while the final was played at the Capital Centre in Landover, Maryland, U.S. First-seeded Martina Navratilova won the singles title and earned $28,000 first-prize money.

Finals

Singles

 Martina Navratilova defeated  Sylvia Hanika 6–1, 6–1
 It was Navratilova's 1st singles title of the year and the 71st of her career.

Doubles

 Martina Navratilova /  Pam Shriver defeated  Kathy Jordan /  Anne Smith 4–6, 7–5, 6–3
 It was Navratilova's 2nd title of the year and the 149th of her career. It was Shriver's 1st title of the year and the 35th of her career.

Prize money

Notes

References

External links
 International Tennis Federation (ITF) tournament edition details

Virginia Slims of Washington
Virginia Slims of Washington